Halarchaeum (common abbreviation Hla.) is a genus of halophilic archaea in the family of Halobacteriaceae.

References

Archaea genera
Taxa described in 2010
Euryarchaeota